Zeqiri is a surname. Notable people with the surname include:

Andi Zeqiri (born 1999), Swiss footballer
Dafina Zeqiri (born 1989), Kosovo-Albanian singer, songwriter, and composer
Dafina Zeqiri (born 1984), Kosovan composer
Rita Zeqiri (born 1995), Kosovan swimmer